The Paliati Grounds (also known as the Niue High School Oval) is the multi-use national stadium of the Pacific Island nation of Niue. The stadium has a capacity of 1,000 spectators. It is located adjacent to the Niue High School and the Niue campus of the University of the South Pacific.

Tenants
The Paliati Grounds hosts the Niue Soccer Tournament, the Niue national rugby union team, island rugby tournaments, and school athletics.

References

External links 
Soccerway profile
Stadium image
Stadium images

National stadiums
Alofi
Buildings and structures in Niue
Sports venues in Niue
Soccer in Niue